Roman Agrarian History and its Significance for Public and Private Law (original German: Die römische Agrargeschichte in ihrer Bedeutung für das Staats- und Privatrecht) was the habilitation thesis, in law at the University of Berlin in 1891, of Max Weber, who went on to become a renowned sociologist.

The work examines the economic, social and political development of Roman society through the analysis of Roman writings on agriculture, the methods of land surveying and the terms used to designate the land units in Ancient Rome.

References
 Max Weber, Die römische Agrargeschichte in ihrer Bedeutung für das Staats- und Privatrecht (Stuttgart, F. Enke, 1891) at Internet Archive.  Retrieved 27 December 2013
 Max Weber, Roman Agrarian History (trans. Richard I. Frank;  Claremont, Regina Books, 2008) 
 Bendix, Reinhard (1977) Max Weber: an intellectual portrait (Berkeley, U. California P.), p. 2.
 Käsler, Dirk (1979, 1988) Max Weber:  an introduction to his life and work (1979:  trans. Philippa Hurd; Cambridge, Polity P.), p. 7.
 Sampson, Gareth C. (2008).  Review of Weber, Roman Agrarian History, trans. Richard I. Frank:  Bryn Mawr Classical Review 2009.08.42 2009.08.42.  Retrieved 27 December 2013.

1891 non-fiction books
Sociology books
History books about ancient Rome
Works by Max Weber
Books about legal history
Theses
Books about social history